Typhlops syntherus (common names: 	Barahona Peninsula blindsnake, Barahona worm snake ) is a species of snake in the family Typhlopidae. It is endemic to the island of Hispaniola and occurs in both Haiti and the Dominican Republic. It is oviparous. It is a relatively common species but occurs in an area with dense human population where it is threatened by habitat loss.

References

syntherus
Endemic fauna of Hispaniola
Reptiles of the Dominican Republic
Reptiles of Haiti
Reptiles described in 1965